The Heritage Cup is an international box lacrosse tournament between the national teams of Canada, Iroquois and United States.  The games feature mostly players that were members of National Lacrosse League teams.

2002 Heritage Cup 
The inaugural Heritage Cup was played on October 2, 2002 at the Hershey Centre in Mississauga, Ontario, and featured Team USA against Team Canada. Team USA won the game 21-16.

Rosters 
  	   	
UNITED STATES

Head Coaches: Darris Kilgour (Buffalo), Tony Resch (Philadelphia)

CANADA

Head Coach: Les Bartley (Toronto)

2004 Heritage Cup 
The 2004 Heritage Cup was held at the Pepsi Center in Denver, Colorado on October 16, 2004. The game once again featured Team USA against Team Canada, but this time Team Canada came out on top, winning 17-8.

Rosters 
  	   	
UNITED STATES

Head Coach: Tony ReschAssistant Coach: Jamie BatleyAssistant Coach: Jimmy RogersGeneral Manager: Steve Govett

CANADA

Head Coach: Les BartleyAssistant Coach: Walt ChristiansonAssistant Coach: Ed ComeauAssistant Coach: Bob McMahonGeneral Manager: Johnny Mouradian

Results

References

International lacrosse competitions
Recurring sporting events established in 2002